Station Identification is the first studio album by American hip hop duo Channel Live. It was released on March 21, 1995 via Capitol Records. Recording sessions took place at The Crib in New York City and at Palm Tree Studios. Production was handled by KRS-One, Salaam Remi and Rheji Burrell. The album debuted at number 58 on the Billboard 200 and number 9 on the Top R&B/Hip-Hop Albums.

The album is best known for its lead single, "Mad Izm", which was a collaboration with KRS-One. The song became Channel Live's biggest hit, peaking at #54 on the Billboard Hot 100 and number three on the Hot Rap Singles. The track was remixed by D.I.T.C.'s Buckwild for his 2007 compilation album Rare Studio Masters' as track one on disc one. "Reprogram" reached number 31 on the Maxi-Singles chart.

Track listing

Charts

References

External links

1995 debut albums
Channel Live albums
Capitol Records albums
Albums produced by KRS-One
Albums produced by Salaam Remi